Halloween is the first Halloween album by Mannheim Steamroller.  It is a double album.

Track listing

Disc 1
 "Toccata in de Mole" – 4:08
 "Hall of the Mountain King" – 2:51
 "Harvest Dance" – 3:01
 "The Flying Dutchman" – 3:36
"Z-Row Gravity" – 3:50
 "Funeral March of a Marionette" – 3:00
"Rock & Roll Graveyard" – 3:51
 "Night on Bald Mountain" – 4:17
"Crystal" – 4:15
"All Hallow's Eve" – 3:42
 "The Sorcerer's Apprentice" – 4:50
 "Rite of Twilight" – 4:45
 "Ride of the Valkyries" – 3:25

Disc 2
"Enchanted Forest" – 4:01
"The Other Side" – 4:09
"Enchanted Forest II" – 4:22
"The Reaper" – 3:01
"Ghost Voices" – 4:42
"Alien Spaceship" – 5:33
"Enchanted Forest III" – 2:10
"Mountain King" – 3:42
"Digital Death" – 4:47
"Souls Demise" – 3:28

References

External links
Google Music

2003 albums
Mannheim Steamroller albums
Halloween albums
American Gramaphone albums